The 1953 NBA All-Star Game was an exhibition basketball game played on January 13, 1953, at Allen County War Memorial Coliseum in Fort Wayne, Indiana, home of the Fort Wayne Pistons. The game was the third edition of the National Basketball Association (NBA) All-Star Game and was played during the 1952–53 NBA season. The Western All-Stars team defeated the Eastern All-Stars team 79–75. This was the West's first ever win over the East. Minneapolis Lakers' George Mikan, who led the West with 22 points and 16 rebounds, was named as the All-Star Game Most Valuable Player.

Roster
The players for the All-Star Game were chosen by sports writers in several cities. They were not allowed to select players from their own cities. Players were selected without regard to position. Ten players from each Division were selected to represent the Eastern and Western Division in the All-Star Game. However, Fred Scolari suffered an injury and was unable to participate in the game; one other player was added to the roster. Eight players from the previous year's Western All-Stars roster returned, while only five players from the previous year's Eastern All-Stars roster returned. Eight players, Don Barksdale, Carl Braun, Billy Gabor, Mel Hutchins, Neil Johnston, Slater Martin, Paul Seymour and Bill Sharman, were selected for the first time. Barksdale, one of the first African American players in the NBA, became the first African American to play in an All-Star Game. The Boston Celtics were represented by four players in the roster while three other teams, the Minneapolis Lakers, the New York Knickerbockers, and the Rochester Royals, were represented by three players each on the roster. The starters were chosen by each team's head coach. Minneapolis Lakers head coach John Kundla returned to coach the Western All-Stars for the third straight year. New York Knickerbockers head coach Joe Lapchick was named as the Eastern All-Stars head coach for the second time.

Game
The West defeated the East by 4 points. The game was a tight contest with plenty of lead changes in the first three quarters. In the fourth quarter, West's Bob Davies scored eight successive points to give the West a lead. The West outscored the East 22–20 in the fourth quarter to win the game by four points. However, the All-Star Game Most Valuable Player Award went to Minneapolis Lakers center George Mikan who scored a game-high 22 points and 16 rebounds for the West. Boston Celtics' Ed Macauley led the East with 18 points while Syracuse Nationals' Dolph Schayes recorded 13 rebounds. Despite losing the game, the East had more balanced scoring with four players scoring in double-figures while the West only had Mikan and Larry Foust scoring in double-figures. Both teams did not shoot well, the East had 37.9 field goal percentage, while the West only managed to make 35.4 percent of its shots. The combined 154 points scored is the lowest total points scored in an All-Star Game.

Box score

References
General

Specific

External links
NBA All-Star Game History
NBA.com: All-Star Game: Year-by-Year Results

1953
All-Star Game
NBA All-Star Game, 1953
1953 in sports in Indiana
January 1953 sports events in the United States
Basketball competitions in Indiana